Karel Černý is the name of:

 Karel Černý (actor) (1892–?), Czechoslovak actor in The Blue Star Hotel
 Karel Černý (art director) (1922–2014), Czech Academy Award winner
Karel Černý of the Prague Section of IADR

 Karel Černý (footballer) (born 1910), represented Czechoslovakia in the 1938 FIFA World Cup
 Karel Černý (rower), Czechoslovak rower who came second in quad scull at the 1977 World Rowing Championships
 Carl Czerny (1791–1857),  Austrian pianist, composer and teacher